Antonio García García (born 15 August 1948) is a Spanish boxer. He competed in the men's flyweight event at the 1972 Summer Olympics.

References

External links
 

1948 births
Living people
Spanish male boxers
Olympic boxers of Spain
Boxers at the 1972 Summer Olympics
Place of birth missing (living people)
Flyweight boxers